Núria Gispert i Feliu (6 June 1936 – 16 September 2020) was a Spanish politician, Catholic activist and social worker. She was born in Barcelona. She was a member of the Socialists' Party of Catalonia. Between 1979 to 1995, she was a member of the City Council of Barcelona.

Feliu died on 16 September 2020 in Barcelona of colon cancer at the age of 84.

References

1936 births
2020 deaths
Deaths from colorectal cancer
Political activists
Politicians from Barcelona
Spanish socialist feminists
Socialists' Party of Catalonia politicians
Spanish feminists
Spanish Roman Catholics
Spanish Christian socialists
Spanish Socialist Workers' Party politicians
Barcelona municipal councillors
Deaths from cancer in Spain
20th-century Spanish politicians
20th-century Spanish women politicians